Moffett's solution is a mixture of adrenaline, sodium bicarbonate and cocaine that is used to provide topical analgesia and vasoconstriction during ear, nose, and throat surgery, especially for operations on the nose.

References

Analgesics